Bruckner, Brueckner or Brückner (German: from Middle Low German brugge or Middle High German brugge brücke brügge "bridge" + the agent suffix -ner hence a topographic name for someone living by a bridge an occupational name for a bridge toll collector or in the southeast (Silesia for example) a bridge keeper or repairer) is a surname. Notable people with the surname include:

Agnes Bruckner (born 1985), American actress
Aleksander Brückner (1856–1939), Polish philologist
Amy Bruckner (born 1991), American actress
Anton Bruckner (1824–1896), Austrian composer, music theorist and classical organist
David Bruckner (c. 1977), American film director
D. J. R. Bruckner (1933–2013), American journalist
Eduard Brückner (1862–1927), German scientist
Ferdinand Bruckner (1891–1958), Austrian-German writer and theater manager
Henry Bruckner (1871–1942), American politician
Karl Bruckner (1906–1986), Austrian writer
Karel Brückner (born 1939), Czech football coach
Pascal Bruckner (born 1948), French writer
Ronny Bruckner (1957–2013), Belgian businessman
Wilhelm Brückner (1884–1954)
Wilhelm Brückner (murderer) (c.1894–1925)
Wilhelm Brückner-Rüggeberg (1906–1985)

See also

German toponymic surnames

German-language surnames